GParted (acronym of GNOME Partition Editor) is a GTK front-end to GNU Parted and an official GNOME partition-editing application (alongside  Disks). GParted is used for creating, deleting, resizing, moving, checking, and copying disk partitions and their file systems. This is useful for creating space for new operating systems, reorganizing disk usage, copying data residing on hard disks, and mirroring one partition with another (disk imaging). It can also be used to format a USB drive.

Background 
GParted uses libparted to detect and manipulate devices and partition tables while several (optional) file system tools provide support for file systems not included in libparted. These optional packages will be detected at runtime and do not require a rebuild of GParted. GParted supports the following filesystems: Ext2, Ext3, Ext4, FAT16, FAT32, HFS, HFS+, JFS, Linux-swap, ReiserFS, Reiser4, UFS, XFS, and NTFS.

GParted is written in C++ and uses gtkmm to interface with GTK. The general approach is to keep the GUI as simple as possible and in conformity with the GNOME Human Interface Guidelines.

The GParted project provides a live operating system including GParted which can be written to a Live CD, a Live USB and other media. The operating system is based on Debian. GParted is also available on other Linux live CDs, including recent versions of Puppy, Knoppix, SystemRescueCd and Parted Magic. GParted is preinstalled when booting from "Try Ubuntu" mode on an Ubuntu installation media.

An alternative to this software is GNOME Disks.

Supported features
GParted supports the following operations on file systems (provided that all features were enabled at compile-time and all required tools are present on the system). The 'copy' field indicates whether GParted is capable of cloning the mentioned filesystem.

Cloning with GParted 
GParted is capable of cloning by copying and pasting. GParted is not capable of cloning an entire disk, but only one partition at a time. The file system being cloned should not be mounted. GParted clones partitions at the filesystem-level, and as a result is capable of cloning different target-size partitions for the same source, as long as the size of the source filesystem does not exceed the size of the target partition.

See also

 Comparison of disk cloning software
 GNU Parted
 GNU GRUB
 KDE Partition Manager
 List of disk partitioning software
 Partition (computing)

References

External links

 
 Official website on SourceForge

Free partitioning software
Free software programmed in C++
GNOME Applications
Operating system distributions bootable from read-only media